North Arm is a settlement in Lafonia, the southern part of East Falkland, in the Falkland Islands, It is on the south coast, on the shore of the Bay of Harbours, and overlooks Sea Lion Island in the distance. In 2007, the population was 25 people, six of them children. It is the largest settlement on East Falkland south of Goose Green.

"In the 1893-4 season, the steam shearing machine was introduced to the Falkland Islands Company farm at North Arm." 

Despite this hand shearing continued at many other farms until the early 1960s.

North Arm was owned by the Falkland Islands Company until 1991, when it was sold to the government. There is a school, a community centre and a shop that opens for three hours a week.

References

Populated places on East Falkland